The 2010 Minnesota House of Representatives election was held in the U.S. state of Minnesota on November 2, 2010, to elect members to the House of Representatives of the 87th Minnesota Legislature. A primary election was held in several districts on August 10, 2010.

The Republican Party of Minnesota won a majority of seats, defeating the Minnesota Democratic–Farmer–Labor Party (DFL), which had a majority since defeating the Republicans in the 2006 election. The new Legislature convened on January 4, 2011.

Results

Match-up summary

See also
 2010 Minnesota Senate election
 2010 Minnesota gubernatorial election
 2010 Minnesota elections

References

External links
 Color shaded map showing winning margin by district (PDF) at 2010 Election Maps, Minnesota Secretary of State

2010 Minnesota elections
Minnesota House of Representatives elections
Minnesota House of Representatives